Sonia Bo (born 27 March 1960) is an Italian pianist, conductor and composer.

Life
Sonia Bo was born in Lecco, Italy, and studied with Renato Dionisi and Azio Corghi at the Milan Conservatory, where she graduated in 1985. In 1988 she continued her studies with Franco Donatoni at the  Accademia di Santa Cecilia in Rome.

After completing her studies, she taught music at universities in Ferrara, Verona, Pesaro and Piacenza. In 1997 she took a position teaching composition at the Conservatorio di Milano. She married composer Giuseppe Colardo.

Honors and awards
First prize, Guido d’Arezzo Composers Competition (1985)
First prize, composition competition of the European Cultural Foundation (1985)
First prize, composition competition G. Savagnone in Rome (1986)
First Prize, the international composition competition Alpe Adria Giovani in Trieste (1988)
Gold plate, the international Premio Città di Trieste (1995)
Acknowledgment, Okanagan Music Festival for Composers (1983)
Friuli Prize (1985)
Ennio Porrino Prize (1985)
Franco Evangelisti Prize (1987)
Valentino Bucchi Prize (1989)

Works
Bo composes orchestral, chamber, choral, vocal, piano, organ, and electroacoustic works. Selected compositions include:
Frammenti da Jacopone
Da una lettura di Husserl
Quartetto
Due Bagatelle
Synopsis
Concerto for chamber orchestra

References

External links
List of works

1960 births
Living people
20th-century classical composers
Italian music educators
Women classical composers
Italian classical composers
20th-century Italian composers
Women music educators
20th-century women composers